In Pennsylvania, intermediate units are regional educational service agencies, established by the Pennsylvania General Assembly. Intermediate units are public entities and serve a given geographic area's educational needs and function as a step of organization above that of a public school district, but below that of the Pennsylvania Department of Education.

Description

Governance
Intermediate units are governed by a board of directors; each member is also a member of a local school board from the IU's region. Board members are elected by school directors of all the region's school districts for three-year terms that begin July 1. IU board members have a separate fiduciary responsibility to the IU and are not intended to be representatives of their home districts. They are funded by school districts, state and federal program specific funding and grants. IUs do not have the power to tax. Annual budgets of the intermediate unit must be approved by a majority of the school boards in  the districts it serves.

Creation
The Pennsylvania state system of intermediate units (IU) was created in 1970, as part of the public school system of the Commonwealth, replacing the 67 county superintendents of schools offices which had existed since the 1850s.  Act 102 created the boundaries for each IU, assigned every school district to an intermediate unit, established a system of governance and a mechanism for funding IUs, and identified a broad array of services IUs may provide. These include: curriculum development and instructional improvement; educational planning services; instructional materials services  (technology); continuing professional development; pupil personnel services; management services; and, state and federal agency liaison services.

List of intermediate units
There are twenty-nine intermediate units in the Commonwealth of Pennsylvania, each serving a given region:

IU1 - Intermediate Unit 1 (Fayette, Greene, and Washington Counties)   IU 1 Web site 
IU2 - Pittsburgh-Mt. Oliver Intermediate Unit (Pittsburgh Public Schools)
IU3 -  Allegheny Intermediate Unit (AIU) (Allegheny County, except Pittsburgh Public Schools)   IU 3 Web site
IU4 -  Midwestern Intermediate Unit (MIU) (Butler, Lawrence, and Mercer Counties)   IU 4 Web site
IU5 - Northwest Tri-County Intermediate Unit (Crawford, Erie, and Warren Counties)   IU 5 Web site
IU6 - Riverview Intermediate Unit (Clarion, Forest, Jefferson, and Venango Counties)   IU 6 Web site
IU7 - Westmoreland Intermediate Unit (Westmoreland County)   IU 7 Web site
IU8 - Appalachia Intermediate Unit (Bedford, Blair, Cambria, and Somerset Counties)   IU 8 Web site
IU9 - Seneca Highlands Intermediate Unit (Cameron, Elk, McKean, and Potter Counties)   IU 9 Web site
IU10 -  Central Intermediate Unit (CIU) (Centre, Clearfield, and Clinton Counties)   IU 10 Web site
IU11 -  Tuscarora Intermediate Unit (TIU) (Fulton, Huntingdon, Juniata, and Mifflin Counties)   IU 11 Web site
IU12 - Lincoln Intermediate Unit (Adams, Franklin, and York Counties)   IU 12 Web site
IU13 - Lancaster-Lebanon Intermediate Unit (Lancaster and Lebanon Counties)   IU 13 Web site
IU14 - Berks County Intermediate Unit (Berks County)   IU 14 Web site
IU15 -  Capital Area Intermediate Unit (CAIU) (Cumberland, Dauphin, and Perry Counties)   IU 15 Web site
IU16 - Central Susquehanna Intermediate Unit (Columbia, Montour, Northumberland, Snyder, and Union Counties)   IU 16 Web site
IU17 -  Bradford Lycoming Sullivan Tioga Intermediate Unit (BLaST) (Bradford, Lycoming, Sullivan, and Tioga Counties)   IU 17 Web site
IU18 - Luzerne Intermediate Unit (Luzerne and Wyoming Counties)   IU 18 Web site
IU19 - Northeastern Educational Intermediate Unit (Lackwanna, Susquehanna, and Wayne Counties)   IU 19 Web site
IU20 - Colonial Intermediate Unit (Monroe, Northampton, and Pike Counties)   IU 20 Web site
IU21 - Carbon Lehigh Intermediate Unit (Carbon and Lehigh Counties)   IU 21 Web site
IU22 - Bucks County Intermediate Unit (Bucks County)   IU 22 Web site
IU23 - Montgomery County Intermediate Unit (Montgomery County)   IU 23 Web site
IU24 - Chester County Intermediate Unit (Chester County)   IU 24 Web site
IU25 - Delaware County Intermediate Unit (Delaware County)   IU 25 Web site
IU26 - Philadelphia Intermediate Unit (Philadelphia Public Schools)    IU 26 Web site
IU27 - Beaver Valley Intermediate Unit (Beaver County)   IU 27 Web site
IU28 - Armstrong-Indiana Intermediate Unit (ARIN) (Armstrong and Indiana Counties)   IU 28 Web site
IU29 - Schuylkill Intermediate Unit (Schuylkill County)   IU 29 Web site

See also
 List of Pennsylvania state agencies

References

External links
PA Intermediate Unit Web site
Map of Pennsylvania's Intermediate Units

Public education in Pennsylvania
 
Education in Pittsburgh
Education in Harrisburg, Pennsylvania
Education in Erie, Pennsylvania
Education in Lancaster, Pennsylvania
Education in Philadelphia
Pennsylvania